As of 2002, ethnic Chinese and Chinese American people comprise the second-largest Asian-origin ethnic group in the Wayne–Macomb–Oakland tri-county area in Metro Detroit. As of that year there were 16,829 ethnic Chinese, concentrated mainly in Troy, Rochester Hills, and Canton Township. As of 2012, Madison Heights also hosts a significant Chinese community.

Within the city of Detroit, the area north of Downtown Detroit; including the region around the Henry Ford Hospital, the Detroit Medical Center, and Wayne State University; has transient Asian national origin residents who are university students or hospital workers; most of these Asians are Chinese and Indians. Few of them have permanent residency after schooling ends.

As of 2011, the largest still-operating Chinatown in proximity to Metro Detroit is located in the Chinatown of Windsor, Ontario.

History
Ah Chee, the first known Chinese person in Detroit, arrived in 1872 and established a laundry business. The first Chinese businesses were established in Metro Detroit in 1879, making the Chinese the Asian immigrant group with the longest history in the city. Many Chinese started coming to Detroit after Ah Chee established laundry businesses. At one time Detroit had its own Chinatown. In 1892, several immigrants to Detroit were sentenced to hard labor for illegally entering the country but, in Wong Wing v. United States, the U.S. Supreme Court ruled that a jury trial was needed for such a punishment.

During the period of Chinese Exclusion, many Chinese immigrants chose to enter the United States extra-legally. This was frequently done by taking the Canadian Pacific Railroad from Vancouver, British Columbia to Windsor, Ontario.  From there immigrants could attempt to cross the Detroit river into the United States after contracting with smuggling organizations in the area. These crossings were often perilous, with numerous fatalities being reported during the time.

In 1905 the first Chinese restaurant opened in Detroit. In the early 20th century Henry Ford recruited ethnic Chinese living in Hawaii to work at his automobile plants. In the 1920s Detroit had 300 Chinese laundry businesses and 12 Chinese restaurants. Helen Zia, author of Asian American Dreams: The Emergence of an American People, wrote that the Chinese business community in Detroit had its peak in the 1920s.

More Chinese people moved to Detroit in the 1930s, but the Chinese business and the population of Detroit's Chinatown had begun to decline after the 1920s. Much of the Chinatown was demolished in the 1950s so the John C. Lodge Freeway could be built. As a result, Chinatown moved to an area in the southern Cass Corridor focused on the intersection of Cass Avenue and Peterboro Street. In 1951 about 2,000 Chinese lived in the Detroit city limits.

The more highly educated ethnic Chinese who moved to Detroit after the Immigration Act of 1965 moved to Detroit's suburbs, bypassing Detroit itself and its Chinatown. The previous generation of established laundry and restaurant owners had children who, instead of staying in the Chinatown area, tended to move outward to the suburbs of Metro Detroit, or to other cities for work and educational opportunities.

Chinese American architect and engineer Marvin Chin opened the landmark tiki-themed restaurant nightclub Chin Tiki in 1967.

The 1980 U.S. Census counted 1,213 ethnic Chinese in the City of Detroit. Zia wrote that the figure was "surely an undercount" but that the Chinese population in the City of Detroit "was unquestionably small." The presence of family-owned businesses in the Detroit Chinatown area had declined by the 1980s. Zia wrote that by that decade, the "shrinking base" in the Detroit Chinatown "reflected the diminished role of the merchants."

In 1982, in Metro Detroit autoworkers killed Vincent Chin, a Chinese American mistaken for a Japanese American. An October 27, 2009 article by the Detroit Free Press stated that "It took the slaying of[...] Vincent Chin by a disgruntled autoworker in 1982 to awaken Detroit of the ugliness and danger of anti-Asian racism." Cynthia Lee, a Chinese American from Hawaii who worked as a reporter for The Detroit News, interviewed Metro Detroit Chinese Americans who criticized the verdict given to the two men, who pleaded guilty and received probation and fines. The Chinese Americans interviewed by Lee stated that the sentences were too light.

Cultural institutions
The Association of Chinese Americans (ACA) is the Detroit chapter of the OCA - Asian Pacific American Advocates. In the fall of 1971 Dr. Andrew Yang invited a group of Chinese Americans in Metro Detroit to hear K.L. Wang's presentation that advocated for the establishment of a national Chinese-American association. The members of the ACA held its first meeting in 1971 in order to establish the organization. The organization was founded in 1972.

The Chinese Community Center (CCC) of the ACA is located in Madison Heights. The center opened on August 8, 2005.

Historically, the Chinese Welfare Council and the On Leong Merchants Association served members of Detroit's Chinese community. In Detroit the On Leong had social functions. The Detroit Chinese Welfare Council attended political functions and represented the interests of Chinatown to the city government.

Education
The American Chinese School at Greater Detroit (ACSGD), a supplementary Chinese school, is located in Birmingham. The first school year was 1972–1973. Other supplementary Chinese schools in Metro Detroit include the Canton Plymouth Chinese Learning Center in Canton, founded in September 1996; and the Michigan New Century Chinese School in Livonia, founded in January 2000.

Healthcare and elderly services
The Association of Chinese Americans operated a Chinatown clinic in the Cass Corridor Chinatown from September 9, 1973 until 1996. The Detroit Drop-In Center, a center providing services to older Chinese Americans in the Cass Chinatown, opened in October 1990. In 2005 its operations in the Canton and Plymouth areas opened. In January 2011 the main center moved to a new location in the Hannan House along Woodward Avenue.

Notable people
 Grace Lee Boggs
 Vincent Chin (murder victim)
 Mei Lin (chef) - Dearborn
 Anita Lo (restaurateur) - Birmingham

See also
 Demographics of Metro Detroit
 American Revolutionary: The Evolution of Grace Lee Boggs
 History of the Japanese in Metro Detroit
 Wong Wing v. United States

References
 Darden, Joe T. and Richard W. Thomas. Detroit: Race Riots, Racial Conflicts, and Efforts to Bridge the Racial Divide. Michigan State University Press, March 1, 2013. , 9781609173524.
 Delicato, Armando and Julie Demery. Detroit's Corktown. Arcadia Publishing, 2007. , 9780738551555.
 Delicato, Armando and Elias Kahlil. Detroit's Cass Corridor. Arcadia Publishing, 2012. , 9780738582689.
 Mayer, Albert. Ethnic groups in Detroit, 1951. Wayne University Department of Sociology and Anthropology, 1951.
 Zia, Helen. Asian American Dreams: The Emergence of an American People. Macmillan, May 15, 2001. , 9780374527365.
 Content from the chapter "Detroit Blues: "Because of You Motherfuckers" by Helen Zia was re-published in: Shen Wu, Jean Yu-Wen and Thomas Chen (editors). Asian American Studies Now: A Critical Reader. Rutgers University Press, March 8, 2010. p. 35. , 9780813549330.

Notes

Further reading
 Ohnuki-Tierney, Emiko. The Detroit Chinese: A Study of Socio-cultural Changes in the Detroit Chinese Community from 1872 Through 1963. University of Wisconsin–Madison, 1964.

External links
 Association of Chinese Americans Detroit - Detroit Chapter of the OCA - Asian Pacific American Advocates
 Chinese Association of Greater Detroit (S: 底特律中国人协会, T: 底特律中國人協會, P: Dǐtèlǜ Zhōngguórén Xiéhuì)
 American Chinese School at Greater Detroit
 Chinese School Association in Michigan (S: 密西根中文学校协会, T: 密西根中文學校協會, P: Mìxīgēn Zhōngwén Xuéxiào Xiéhuì)

Chinese
Chinese-American history
Detroit
History of Detroit